, professionally known as , is a Japanese racing driver, motoring journalist, and driving instructor. He is the son of former Nissan works racing driver and Yamaha factory motorcycle racer, Yoshikazu Sunako.  

Sunako competed in the Super Taikyu Series (formerly the N1 Endurance Series, and Super N1 Endurance Series) from 1990 to 2008. He won the Class 1 championship in 1996 driving a Nissan Skyline GT-R.   

He suffered a broken leg and minor burns in an accident at Fuji Speedway during the All-Japan Fuji GT Race on 3 May, 1998, when his car spun off during the formation laps in torrential rain, and was then struck by the Ferrari F355 of Tetsuya Ota which also lost control and burst into flames. Sunako recovered from his injuries and continued to race in the All-Japan Grand Touring Car Championship / Super GT Series until 2006.  

He retired in 2008, but came back to racing in 2018 to compete in the GT World Challenge Asia series in a BMW Team Studie M4 GT4. Sunako and Takayuki Kinoshita steered BMW Team Studie to the GT4 teams' championship in 2018, and Sunako won the GT4 overall drivers' championship in 2019.  

In 2012, Sunako established Tokyo Virtual Circuit, a simulator facility based in the Minato ward of Tokyo.

Complete JGTC/Super GT Results

References 

1964 births
Living people
Japanese racing drivers

Super GT drivers
Japanese Formula 3 Championship drivers